Evelyn is a given name in the English language, where it can be used as a first name or a surname.

The name originally was used as a surname, which derived from Aveline, a feminine Norman French diminutive of the name Ava. 
Ava itself is a hypocoristic Germanic name, of uncertain origin.

Evelyn is also sometimes used as an Anglicisation of the Irish Aibhilín or Éibhleann. Aibhilín (variant Eibhlín) is itself derived from the Norman French Aveline. Éibhleann (variant Éibhliu), on the other hand, is said to be derived from the Old Irish óiph ("beauty").

Variant forms of the feminine first name Evelyn include: Evaline, Evalyn, Eveleen, Evelien, Eveliene, Evelin, Evelina, Eveline, Evelyne, Évelyne and Ewaline. Some of these forms may (also) have arisen as diminutive forms of Eve.

People with this first name

Women
Evelyn M. Anderson (1899–1985), American physiologist and biochemist
Evelyn Ankers (1918–1985), American actress 
Evelyn Ashford (born 1957), America female sprinter, gold medalist of the women's 100 meters running during the 1984 Summer Olympics
Evelyn Aswad (fl. 1990s–2020s), American legal scholar and professor at the University of Oklahoma College of Law
Evelyn Margaret Ay (1933–2008), American beauty pageant winner (Miss America, 1954)
Evelyn Vida Baxter (1879–1959), Scottish ornithologist
Evelyn Beauchamp,  (1901–1980), daughter of 5th Earl of Carnarvon and one of the first in people in modern times to enter Tutankhamun's tomb
Evelyn Berezin (1925–2018), American computer designer best known for designing the first computer-driven word processor
Evelyn Bonaci (1916–2008), Maltese politician
Evelyn Booth (1897–1988), Irish botanist
Evelyn Brent (1901–1975), American film and stage actress
Evelyn Campbell (actress) (1868 – ?), British-born American actress
Evelyn Carow (born 1931), German movie editor
Evelyn Carrera (born 1971), Dominican Republic volleyball player
Evelyn Cavendish, Duchess of Devonshire (1870–1960)
Evelyn Cheesman (1882–1969), British entomologist and traveller
Evelyn Colon, Formerly unidentified American homicide victim
Evelyn Colyer (1902–1930), British tennis player
Evelyn Magruder DeJarnette (1842–1914), American author
Evelyn De Morgan (1855–1919), English Pre-Raphaelite painter
Evelyn de Soysa (1893–1973), third woman member of Senate of Ceylon (present-day Sri Lanka)
Evelyn Dick (1920-unknown), Canadian convicted murderer
Evelyn Dove (1902–1987), British singer and actress
Evelyn Everett-Green (1856–1932), English novelist 
Evelyn Finley (1916–1989), American actress and stuntwoman
Evelyn Furtsch (1914–2015), American sprinter
Evelyn Gandy (1920–2007), American Lieutenant Governor of the state of Mississippi
Evelyn García (born 1982), Salvadorian cyclist
Evelyn Gardner (1903–1994), English aristocrat and socialite, and first wife of Evelyn Waugh
Evelyn Gigantes (born 1945), Canadian politician and Cabinet Minister
Evelyn Glennie (born 1965), Scottish virtuoso percussionist who has been deaf since age 12
Evelyn Gleeson (1855–1944), English embroidery, carpet, and tapestry designer
Evelyn Beatrice Hall (1868–1956), English writer and biographer of Voltaire
Evelyn Hamann (1942–2007), German actress 
Evelyn Hart (born 1956), Canadian ballerina and principal dancer of the Royal Winnipeg Ballet
Evelyn Hartley (born 1937), American woman who has been missing since 1953
Evelyn Hatch (1871–1951), English muse of Charles Lutwidge Dodgson
Evelyn Holt (1908–2001), German film actress
Evelyn Hooker (1907–1996), American psychologist most noted for her studies on homosexuality
Evelyn Bryan Johnson (1909–2012), American pilot with a world record number of flying hours
Evelyn Keyes (1916–2008), American actress most noted for her role as Suellen O'Hara in the 1939 film Gone with the Wind
Evelyn "Champagne" King (born 1960), American R&B and disco singer 
Evelyn Künneke (1921–2001), German singer and actress 
Evelyn Lau (born 1971), Chinese-Canadian poet and novelist
Evelyn Laye (1900–1996), British theatre actress
Evelyn Lear (1926–2012), American soprano and opera singer
Evelyn Lincoln (1909–1995), personal secretary to John F. Kennedy from his election to the Senate in 1953 until his 1963 assassination
Evelyn Beatrice Longman (1874–1954), American sculptor elected as a full member of the National Academy of Design
Evelyn Mase (1922–2004), South African nurse and first wife of Nelson Mandela
Evelyn Matthei (born 1953), Chilean politician, former Minister of Labor and candidate for President of Chile in 2013
Evelyn McHale (1923–1947), American bookkeeper, subject of an iconic photograph showing her body after she jumped from an observation platform of the Empire State Building
Evelyn Mora (born 1992), Finnish entrepreneur
Evelyn Nesbit (1884–1967), American model noted for her entanglement in the murder of her ex-lover by her first husband
Evelyn Paul (1883–1963), British illustrator
Evelyn Preer (1896–1932), African-American actress and blues singer
Evelyn Reed (1905–1979), leading member of the American Socialist Workers Party and women's rights agitator
Evelyn Regner (born 1966), Austrian Member of the European Parliament
Evelyn Sandberg-Vavalà (1888–1961) also known as Evelyn May Graham Sandberg or Evelyn Kendrew, art historian
Evelyn Sears (1875–1966), American tennis player
Evelyn Selbie (1871–1950), American actress
Evelyn Sharma (born 1986), German-Indian actress and model
Evelyn Šilina (born 2001), Estonian footballer
Evelyn Stevens (cyclist) (born 1983), American road cyclist
Evelyn Greenleaf Sutherland (1855–1908), American journalist, author and playwright
Evelyn Thomas (born 1945), American disco singer
Evelyn Tubb, English soprano and long-time member of The Consort of Musicke
Evelyn Underhill (1875–1941), English writer on mysticism and metaphysical poet
Evelyn van Leeuwen (born 1972), Dutch wheelchair basketball player
Evelyn Varden (1893–1958), American character actress
Evelyn Verrasztó (born 1989), Hungarian swimmer
Evelyn Svec Ward (1921–1989), American fiber artist
Evelyn Wells (1899–1984), American biographer, especially of the ancient Egyptian royals
Evelyn Whitaker (1844–1929), English children's writer
Evelyn Williams (artist) (1929–2012), British artist
Evelyn Williamson (born 1971), New Zealand triathlon athlete
Evelyn M. Witkin (born 1921), American geneticist
Evelyn Wood (teacher) (1909–1995), American advocate of speed reading
Evelyn Young (19151983), American film actress
Evelyn Zangger (born 1980), Swiss singer-songwriter

Female variants
Eveleen
Eveleen Myers (1856–1937), English photographer
Eveleen Mary Weldon Severn (1882–1942), American philatelist

Evelien
Evelien Bosmans (born 1989), Belgian actress
Evelien Gerrits (born 1985), Dutch cricketer 
Evelien Koogje (born 1959), Dutch rower

Evelin
Evelin Hagoel (born 1961), Israeli actress
Evelin Ilves (born 1958), former First Lady of Estonia
Evelin Jahl (born 1956), German discus thrower
Evelin Lanthaler (born 1991), Italian luger 
Evelin Lindner (born 1954), German-Norwegian medical doctor, psychologist, scholar and author
Evelin Novak (born 1985), Croatian opera soprano
Evelin Ramón (born 1979), Cuban composer and singer
Evelin Samuel (born 1975), Estonian singer
Evelin Talts (born 1977), Estonian long-distance runner
Evelin Vacsi (born 1993), Hungarian volleyball player
Evelin Võigemast (born 1980), Estonian actress

Eveline
Eveline Brunner (born 1996), Swiss figure skater
Eveline Burgess (1856–1936), American chess player
Eveline M. Burns (1900–1985), British-American economist, writer and instructor
Eveline Crone (born 1975), Dutch neuroscientist 
Eveline Cruickshanks (1926–2021), British historian 
Eveline Du Bois-Reymond Marcus (1901–1990), German zoologist and drawer
Eveline Fischer (born 1969), British video game music composer
Éveline Gélinas (born 1974), Canadian actress
Eveline de Haan (born 1976), Dutch field hockey player
Eveline Hanska (c.1805–1882), Polish noblewoman, wife of Honoré de Balzac
Eveline Hasler (born 1933), Swiss writer
Eveline Herfkens (born 1952), Dutch civil servant, diplomat, and politician
Eveline Hill (1898–1973), British Conservative Party politician 
Eveline Lowe (1869–1956), British politician 
Eveline Adelheid von Maydell (1890–1962), German silhouette artist
Eveline Nünchert (born 1943), German chess player
Eveline Peleman (born 1993), Belgian rower 
Eveline Peterson (1877–1944), English badminton player
Eveline Winifred Syme (born 1888–1961), Australian artist 
Eveline Widmer-Schlumpf (born 1956), Swiss lawyer and politician

Evelyne
Evelyne Brochu (born 1983), Canadian actress
Evelyne Gebhardt (born 1954), German politician
Evelyne Hall (1909–1993), American athlete
Evelyne Leu (born 1976), Swiss freestyle skier
Évelyne Sullerot (1924–2017), French feminist
Évelyne Thomas (born 1964), French television host

Men
Evelyn Ashley (1836–1907), British barrister and Liberal politician
Evelyn Baring, 1st Earl of Cromer (1841–1917), Consul-General of Egypt from 1883 to 1907
Evelyn Baring, 1st Baron Howick of Glendale (1903–1973), Governor of Kenya from 1952 to 1959
Evelyn Barker (1894–1983), British Army officer in World War I and II 
Evelyn Boscawen, 6th Viscount Falmouth (1819–1889), British horse breeder
Evelyn Denison, 1st Viscount Ossington (1800–1873), British statesman
G. Evelyn Hutchinson (1903–1991), British ecologist 
Evelyn King (politician) (1907–1994), British member of Parliament
Evelyn Frederick Charles Ludowyk (1906–1985), Sri Lankan Burgher Trotskyist, author, playwright, critic
Evelyn Owen (1915–1949), Australian inventor of the Owen submachine gun
Evelyn Pierrepont, 1st Duke of Kingston-upon-Hull (c. 1655–1726)
Evelyn Pierrepont, 2nd Duke of Kingston-upon-Hull (1711–1773)
Evelyn Pierrepont (MP) (1775–1801), British Member of Parliament
Evelyn de Rothschild (1931–2022), British financier and member of the prominent Rothschild family
Evelyn Seymour, 17th Duke of Somerset (1882–1954)
Evelyn Shirley (1788–1856), British politician
Evelyn Shirley (1812–1882), British politician, antiquary and genealogist
Evelyn Shirley Shuckburgh (1843–1906), English classical scholar
Evelyn Stuart (1773–1842), British soldier and Tory politician
Evelyn Sturt (1815–1885), English-born Australian police magistrate
Evelyn Waugh (1903–1966), English satirical novelist, whose first wife was Evelyn Gardner
Evelyn Webb-Carter (born 1946), former advisor to Elizabeth, the Queen Mother and current Controller of the Army Benevolent Fund
Evelyn Wood (British Army officer) (1838–1919), British Field marshal, Victoria Cross recipient

People with this surname

Deborah Evelyn (born Deborah Evelyn Sochaczewski), Brazilian actress
Edward Evelyn, 1st Baronet, Tory MP
Edward Evelyn (footballer), Welsh athlete
Frederick Evelyn, 3rd Baronet, English aristocrat
George Evelyn (disambiguation), multiple people
Gilbert Evelyn, English politician
Hugh Evelyn, 5th Baronet, British naval officer
John Evelyn (disambiguation):
John Evelyn (1620–1706), English writer, gardener and diarist
John Evelyn (1591–1664), English politician, MP for Bletchingley
John Evelyn (Parliamentarian) (1601–1685), English politician
John Evelyn the Younger (1655–1699), English translator
Sir John Evelyn, 1st Baronet, of Godstone (1633–1671)
John Evelyn (1677–1702), English politician, MP for Bletchingley
Sir John Evelyn, 1st Baronet, of Wotton (1682–1763), British politician
Sir John Evelyn, 2nd Baronet MP for Helston 1727–1741 and 1747–1767 and Penryn 1741–1747
John Evelyn of Wotton (1743–1827), cousin of Frederick Evelyn
Sir John Evelyn, 4th Baronet (c. 1758–1833)
John Evelyn (bobsleigh) (born 1939), British Olympic bobsledder
Judith Evelyn (born Judith Evelyn Morris), American actress
Leya Evelyn, Canadian artist
Lyndon Evelyn, Tory MP
William Evelyn (disambiguation):
William Evelyn (priest) (died 1776), Dean of Emly in Ireland
William Evelyn (British Army officer) (1723–1783), British Lieutenant–General
William Evelyn (died 1813), Member of Parliament for Hythe
William John Evelyn (1822–1908), Member of Parliament for West Surrey and Deptford
William Arthur Evelyn (1860–1935), historian of York

Fictional characters
Evelyn, a character in the film Pearl Harbor
Evelynn, Agony's Embrace, a playable champion character in the video game League of Legends and its associated virtual band K/DA
Evelyn Evelyn, Conjoined twins Eva and Lyn who put their names together to form "Evelyn" so they can clear confusion. Because of their longing for privacy and inability to be separated, they grew to hate each other.
Evil-Lyn, a character from the Masters of the Universe toy line and associated media
Evelyn Borden, a character in The Ring Two and Rings, played by Mary Elizabeth Winstead, Sissy Spacek, and Kayli Carter at different points
Evelyn Carnahan/O'Connell, lead character in Stephen Sommers' reboot of The Mummy franchise
Evelyn Claythorne, former employee of TASCorp, Tari's envious gaming partner, and overall secondary antagonist of Meta Runner seasons two and three.
Evelyn Cross Mulwray, played by Faye Dunaway in the classic noir film Chinatown
Evelyn Deavor, a character in Incredibles 2
Evelyn Harper, mother of Charlie and Alan Harper on Three and a Half Men
Evelyn Hugo, titular character of the novel The Seven Husbands of Evelyn Hugo by Taylor Jenkins Reid
Evelyn Miller, an author in Red Dead Redemption 2, played by Gibson Frazier
Ted Evelyn Mosby, the protagonist in the TV series How I Met Your Mother
Evelyn Napier, a character from Downton Abbey, portrayed by Brendan Patricks
Evelyn Oakleigh, Hope's wealthy and eccentric English fiancé from Anything Goes
Evelyn Robin, the wife of Christopher Robin in Disney's "Christopher Robin"
Evelyn Sharp/Artemis Crock, a fictional character from Arrow
Evelyn Shaw, a character in the TV series Chuck
Evelyn Smythe, played by Maggie Stables in a series of audio plays produced by Big Finish Productions based on Doctor Who
Evelyn Tremble, played by Peter Sellers in the James Bond satire Casino Royale
Evelyn Wang, the protagonist in the film Everything Everywhere All at Once

References

English unisex given names
English feminine given names
English masculine given names
English-language unisex given names
English-language feminine given names
English-language masculine given names
English-language surnames
Given names originating from a surname